"All These Nights" is a song by English singer-songwriter Tom Grennan. It was released on 15 July 2022 as the second single from his forthcoming third studio album What Ifs & Maybes (2023).
 
Speaking about the song, Grennan said, "'All These Nights' is a song about feeling grateful for the good energy and good people in your life. The people that bring you joy and bring you love. This is the start of the new chapter. My sound is evolving. I'm opening the door and I'm announcing that 'this is where it's at now!'"

Music video
An accompanying video was released on 19 August 2022.

Track listings

Charts

Weekly charts

Year-end charts

References

 

 

 
2022 songs
2022 singles
Tom Grennan songs
Songs written by Tom Grennan